Lynden is a city in Whatcom County, Washington, United States.

The city is located along the Nooksack River and State Route 539. The population of Lynden is about 14,259, according to the United States Census Bureau. Lynden is also home to the annual Northwest Washington Fair.

History
Lynden was founded in the 1870s by Phoebe Judson and her husband, Holden, near the site of the Nooksack Indian village Squahamish. Judson named it after the riverside town in Hohenlinden, a poem by Thomas Campbell. According to her book, A Pioneer's Search for an Ideal Home, Judson changed the spelling of "Linden" to be more visually appealing. Lynden was officially incorporated as a city on March 16, 1891. A statue of Judson now sits at the intersection of Front and 6th Street, near the Lynden Chamber of Commerce. 

The city lies in a broad valley formed by the Nooksack River, which empties into nearby Bellingham Bay. The surrounding area is filled with dairy, raspberry, strawberry, and blueberry farms. The region saw significant Dutch immigration in the early and mid 1989, spurring the growth of dairies. The city pays homage to its Dutch heritage through the design of buildings on Front Street and local businesses with "Dutch" names and products. In the early 21st century, the population has nearly doubled in size, with Dutch being more predominate than other ethnic ancestry.

At the time, this was the only known drug tunnel along the US-Canada border.

The first time that a presumptive presidential nominee of a U.S. major political party came to Lynden during a general election year was in May 2016, when Donald Trump visited the city.

Geography
The Nooksack River runs along a short portion of the city's southern border.

Climate
Lynden has a warm-summer Mediterranean climate (Köppen Csb) typical of the North Coast that is characterized by warm (but not hot) dry summers, and mild to chilly rainy winters. In Lynden's case, the climate is moderated by the proximity to the Pacific Ocean, with small temperature variations on average throughout the year, resulting in mild year-round temperatures, although winter months can get quite cool. Lynden, on average, has very wet winters and summers with a few days of rainfall, also representative for the region.

Demographics

2010 census
As of the census of 2010, there were 11,951 people, 4,594 households, and 3,248 families residing in the city. The racial makeup of the city was 89.7% White, 0.7% African American, 0.9% Native American, 2.5% Asian, 0.2% Pacific Islander, 4.0% from other races, and 2.1% from two or more races. Hispanic or Latino of any race were 8.7% of the population.

There were 4,594 households, of which 32.7% had children under the age of 18 living with them, 60.1% were married couples living together, 8.1% had a female householder with no husband present, 2.6% had a male householder with no wife present, and 29.3% were non-families. 26.5% of all households were made up of individuals, and 15.8% had someone living alone who was 65 years of age or older. The average household size was 2.57 and the average family size was 3.11.

The median age in the city was 38.6 years. 26.4% of residents were under the age of 18; 7.6% were between the ages of 18 and 24; 23.5% were from 25 to 44; 22.8% were from 45 to 64; and 19.6% were 65 years of age or older. The gender makeup of the city was 46.8% male and 53.2% female.

2000 census
As of the census of 2000, there were 9,020 people, 3,426 households, and 2,500 families residing in the city. The population density was 2,208.8 people per square mile (853.6/km2). There were 3,592 housing units at an average density of 879.6 per square mile (339.9/km2). The racial makeup of the city was 93.07% White, 0.27% African American, 0.45% Native American, 2.26% Asian, 2.51% from other races, and 1.44% from two or more races. Hispanic or Latino of any race were 4.73% of the population.

There were 3,426 households, out of which 34.5% had children under the age of 18 living with them, 62.8% were married couples living together, 7.9% had a female householder with no husband present, and 27.0% were non-families. 24.8% of all households were made up of individuals, and 15.3% had someone living alone who was 65 years of age or older. The average household size was 2.60 and the average family size was 3.11.

In the city, the age distribution of the population shows 28.2% under the age of 18, 8.0% from 18 to 24, 25.5% from 25 to 44, 19.0% from 45 to 64, and 19.3% who were 65 years of age or older. The median age was 37 years. For every 100 females, there were 89.7 males. For every 100 females ages 18 and over, there were 84.7 males.

The median income for a household in the city was $42,767, and the median income for a family was $50,449. Males had a median income of $39,597 versus $23,292 for females. The per capita income for the city was $20,639. About 4.1% of families and 6.1% of the population were below the poverty line, including 4.5% of those under age 18 and 12.7% of those age 65 or over.

Arts and culture

Events
The Raspberry Festival is held annually during the third weekend in July. The festival includes a basketball tournament, a car show, a fun run, a rock climbing wall, tours of raspberry fields and wineries, and a day-long ice cream social. Other notable events in Lynden include the Farmer's Day Parade, the Sinterklaas/Lighted Christmas Parade, the Antique Tractor Show, and many other events that can be seen in more detail at Lynden's website calendar.

In August, the annual Northwest Washington Fair lures over 200,000 people and allows Whatcom County residents to display the agricultural products, art, crafts, and wares. This regional fair is highly regarded as one of the best family friendly fairs in the state.

Religion
The city is noted for its abundance of churches. At one time, Lynden claimed to hold the world record for most churches per square mile and per capita, although that is unsubstantiated. Due to the town's large population of those who attend or are members of Lynden's many churches, the town has had a long tradition of most businesses closing on Sunday. In recent years, businesses have started to open on Sundays, as in other communities, but the area remains mostly unchanged.  Similarly, a law of 41 years prohibiting Sunday alcohol sales was repealed on October 20, 2008, due to a shift in public opinion.

Education
There are three public elementary schools in Lynden: Isom Elementary, Bernice Vossbeck, and Fisher Elementary. There is also the private Lynden Christian Elementary. There is one public middle school (Lynden Middle School), which moved to a new building in 2018, and also the private Lynden Christian Middle School. The two main high schools are Lynden High School and Lynden Christian High School. There are also several much smaller private schools in the area such as Cornerstone Christian School, Covenant Christian School, and Ebenezer Christian School.

Infrastructure

Transportation
Lynden is served by two state highways: State Route 539, which travels north to the Canadian border and south to Bellingham; and State Route 546, which travels east towards Sumas. The city is home to Lynden Municipal Airport (Jansen Field), located between Benson and Depot roads, with private residences connected to the taxiways. Lynden is also connected via a short branch of the BNSF Railway system, traveling east to a junction with the Sumas Subdivision.

The Whatcom Transportation Authority provides bus service on Route 26 between Lynden and Cordata Station in Bellingham.

Notable people

 Phoebe Judson, the founder of Lynden 
 Ricardo S. Martinez, United States District Court Judge, Western District of Washington
 Yelkanum Seclamatan, a Nooksack chief from the 1800s.
 Ty Taubenheim Major League Baseball Player
 Gordon Wright, an American historian
 Daulton Hommes, basketball player for the Austin Spurs of the NBA G League
 Catherine Burns, actress and screenwriter, Academy Award nominee for Best Actress in a Supporting Role for the 1969 film Last Summer

Sister city
Lynden has one sister city

  Langley, British Columbia, Canada

References

External links
 
 

 
Cities in Washington (state)
Populated places established in 1874
Cities in Whatcom County, Washington
1874 establishments in Washington Territory